Methionopsis is a genus of skippers in the family Hesperiidae.

Species
Recognised species include:
 Methionopsis cinnamomea (Herrich-Schäffer, 1869)
 Methionopsis ina Plötz, 1882
 Methionopsis modestus Godman, 1901
 Methionopsis patage Godman, 1900
 Methionopsis purus Bell, 1940

References

Natural History Museum Lepidoptera genus database

Hesperiinae
Hesperiidae genera